Kopi Mallee could refer to the following species of Eucalyptus:
 Eucalyptus striaticalyx
 Eucalyptus gypsophila